
Gmina Zawady is a rural gmina (administrative district) in Białystok County, Podlaskie Voivodeship, in north-eastern Poland.

The gmina is the proposed location of a new airport to be built near Bialystok.

Villages
Gmina Zawady contains the villages and settlements of Cibory Gałeckie, Cibory-Chrzczony, Cibory-Kołaczki, Cibory-Krupy, Cibory-Marki, Cibory-Witki, Góra Strękowa, Konopki-Klimki, Konopki-Pokrzywnica, Krzewo-Plebanki, Kurpiki, Łaś-Toczyłowo, Maliszewo-Łynki, Maliszewo-Perkusy, Marylki, Nowe Chlebiotki, Nowe Grabowo, Nowe Krzewo, Rudniki, Stare Chlebiotki, Stare Grabowo, Stare Krzewo, Strękowa Góra, Targonie Wielkie, Targonie-Krytuły, Targonie-Wity, Wieczorki, Zawady, Zawady-Borysówka and Zawady-Kolonia.

Neighbouring gminas
Gmina Zawady is bordered by the gminas of Kobylin-Borzymy, Rutki, Trzcianne, Tykocin and Wizna.

References
Polish official population figures 2006

Zawady
Białystok County